"Locked Up" is a song by Senegalese-American singer Akon, taken as the lead single from his debut album, Trouble (2004). The single was released in the United States on April 5, 2004, peaking at number eight on the Billboard Hot 100. Outside of the United States, "Locked Up" peaked within the top 10 of the charts in Ireland and the United Kingdom and the top 20 of the charts in France, Germany, Spain, and Switzerland.

Background
Although it was widely regarded that "Lonely" offered the album's best option in terms of commercial breakthrough and lead single as well as first single, SRC A&R and producer Knobody chose "Locked Up" as the first and lead single because he wanted to break Akon in the streets first, and then cross-over. In an interview for HitQuarters, he claimed: "Locked Up" is a street record. I thought that was the place for us to start to get a fan-base, knowing that weight. We thought really carefully about the record, what touches people and will get people's attention – so we added references of his kin and kith sending him magazines, money-orders, to visit him, ask where his lawyer is, accept his phone calls and ask "where're my niggaz on lockdown." The song was designed a breakout hit for Akon, something that could shape the future of his personal life and widely successful musical career. I worked on what I call "drops" – points in the record where it feels different, to break the monotony and make it a little more interesting."

Remixes and other versions
Knobody produced an alternate of the song, featuring Styles P, which appears as both a B-side on the single and as a bonus track on the UK version of the album. In 2004, T-Pain sampled the song in a parody recording "I'm Fucked Up", which became a main factor in him getting signed to Konvict Kartel. New Zealand rapper Savage appears on a remix on the song that was later included on his debut album, Moonshine, in 2005. The same year, the song was sampled in the track "Won't Let Me Out" by C-Murder. A music video was produced to promote the single. The video was directed by FlyyKai, and was edited to both the album version and the remix featuring Styles P. The French CD single also has a remix featuring French rapper Booba, which is also Akon's favorite "Locked Up" remix. Another remix featuring Styles and British rapper Taz was included on the UK version of Trouble. A remixed version of the song was released on September 4, 2020, by American rapper 6ix9ine titled "Locked Up, Pt. 2" appears on his second studio album, TattleTales (2020).

Track listings
UK CD single
 "Locked Up" – 3:56
 "Locked Up" (featuring Styles P) – 3:50
 "Locked Up" (featuring Taz and Styles P) – 3:54
 "Locked Up" (Video) (featuring Taz and Styles P) – 3:54

UK 12-inch vinyl
 "Locked Up" – 3:56
 "Locked Up" (featuring Styles P) – 3:50
 "Locked Up" (featuring Taz and Styles P) – 3:54
 "Locked Up" (Instrumental) – 3:56

German CD single
 "Locked Up" (featuring Azad) – 3:50
 "Locked Up" (Without Rap) – 3:33
 "Locked Up" (featuring Styles P) – 3:50
 "Gunshot" – 2:56

UK promo single – The Global Remixes
 "Locked Up" – 3:56
 "Locked Up" (featuring Styles P) – 3:50
 "Locked Up" (featuring Taz and Styles P) – 3:56
 "Locked Up" (featuring Azad) – 3:50
 "Locked Up" (featuring Savage) – 3:50
 "Locked Up" (featuring Booba) – 3:50
 "Locked Up" (featuring Mayhem) – 4:22
 "Locked Up" (featuring Julio Voltio) – 3:50

Charts

Weekly charts

Year-end charts

Certifications

Release history

References

Akon songs
2004 singles
2004 songs
American hip hop songs
Song recordings produced by Akon
Songs about prison
Songs based on actual events
Songs critical of religion
Songs written by Akon
SRC Records singles
Universal Music Group singles